This sortable list points to the articles describing various individual (finite) graphs. The columns 'vertices', 'edges', 'radius', 'diameter', 'girth', 'P' (whether the graph is planar), χ (chromatic number) and χ' (chromatic index) are also sortable, allowing to search for a parameter or another. 

See also Graph theory for the general theory, as well as Gallery of named graphs for a list with illustrations.

List

References